This is the list of beaches located in Estonia. The list is incomplete.

 Aa
 Anne Canal
 Emajõe
 Haabneeme
 Harku
 Joaoru
 Kaberneeme
 Kakumäe
 Kärdla
 Kauksi
 Klooga
 Kubija
 Kuremaa
 Kuressaare
 Narva-Jõesuu
 Paide Artificial Lake
 Paralepa
 Pärnu
 Pelgurand = Stroomi Beach
 Pikakari Beach
 Pirita Beach (the largest sand beach in Tallinn)
 Pühajärv
 Riiska
 Stroomi Beach = Pelgurand
 Tallinn
 Tamula
 Toila
 Türi
 Valkla
 Vanamõisa
 Värska
 Verevi
 Viljandi
 Võsu

References

External links
 TOP 10 beaches in Estonia, visitestonia.com

Estonia
Beaches
 
Tourism in Estonia